"The Water Is Wide" might refer to:

The Water Is Wide (book) (1972), by Pat Conroy
The Water Is Wide (2006 film), a Hallmark Hall of Fame TV movie based on Pat Conroy's book
"The Water Is Wide" (song), an English folk song of Scottish origin
The Water Is Wide (Charles Lloyd album) by jazz musician Charles Lloyd
The Water is Wide (Órla Fallon album) by Irish singer Órla Fallon
 "The Water is Wide" (The Unit), an episode of the television series The Unit